Kalina Assembly constituency is one of the 288 Vidhan Sabha constituencies of Maharashtra state in western India.

Overview
Kalina (constituency number 175) is one of the 26 Vidhan Sabha constituencies located in the Mumbai Suburban district. The number of electorates in 2009 was 257,576 (male 144,501, female 113,075).

Kalina is part of the Mumbai North Central Lok Sabha constituency along with five other Vidhan Sabha segments, namely Vile Parle, Chandivali, Kurla, Vandre West and Vandre East in the Mumbai Suburban district.

Members of Legislative Assembly

Election results

Assembly Elections 2019

Assembly Elections 2014

Assembly Elections 2009

See also
 Kalina
 List of constituencies of Maharashtra Vidhan Sabha

References

Assembly constituencies of Mumbai
Politics of Mumbai Suburban district
Assembly constituencies of Maharashtra